Gese Wechel (born in Hamburg, died in Lübeck 1645), was the managing director of the Swedish Post Office, Postverket from 1637 until 1642. She was the second director of the Swedish Post Office, and the first female postmaster in Sweden, entitled Sveriges rikes postmästarinna (Postmistress of the Swedish Realm).

Life
Gese Wechel was originally a domestic servant in the household of the Swedish envoy in Hamburg in Germany. In the 1630s, she married Anders Wechel, a German in Swedish service who managed the Swedish postoffice in Hamburg. In 1636, the Swedish Post Office was founded, and she followed her husband to Sweden, where he received the position as its first managing director. Anders Wechel was in bad health, and she was in reality forced to manage his work as director. 

In 1637, she became a widow and continued to manage the post office, and 25 October 1638 she was officially confirmed in her position as director with the acknowledgement that she had already functioned as such for two years. She worked alongside Steen von Steenhausen, who tended to the juridical matters of the office, and all orders were to be signed by them jointly. 

In 1642, Wechel was fired from her post with reference to her gender. She moved to Lübeck, where she died. Gese Wechel was the first example of the female postmasters in Sweden who took over their profession from their late spouses: from 1637 until 1722, eight percent (or 40) of the postmasters in Sweden were female, and Margareta Beijer had the same position as Wechel in 1669-1673. Women were excluded from service in the new regulation of 1722, and allowed again in 1863.

See also
 Alexandrine von Taxis, German equivalent 
 Dorothea Krag, Danish equivalent

References
 Ingemar Lundkvist, Cirkeln är sluten för brevet, Under Strecket, SvD, 16 maj 2007.
 Forssell, Nils: Svenska Postverkets Historia, Stockholm, 1936.
 Mansdominans i förändring: om ledningsgrupper och styrelser : betänkande Av Sverige Utredningen om kvinnor på ledande poster i näringslivet, Stockholm, 2003

1645 deaths
17th-century Swedish people
17th-century German people
Postmasters-General
Year of birth unknown
17th-century Swedish women
People of the Swedish Empire
17th-century German women
17th-century civil servants